USCHS may refer to:

United States Capitol Historical Society
Upper St. Clair High School, in southern Pittsburgh, Pennsylvania